Athens is a village in Calhoun County in the U.S. state of Michigan. The population was 1,024 at the 2010 census. The village is located in southern Athens Township, and is part of the Battle Creek, Michigan Metropolitan Statistical Area.  It was settled in 1831.

Geography
The Nottawa Creek, also known as the Nottawa River, flows through Athens.

Demographics

2010 census
As of the census of 2010, there were 1,024 people, 387 households, and 279 families living in the village. The racial makeup of the village was 95.4% White, 0.5% African American, 0.9% Native American, 0.1% Asian, 0.1% Pacific Islander, 0.8% from other races, and 2.2% from two or more races. Hispanic or Latino of any race were 1.4% of the population.

There were 387 households, of which 34.6% had children under the age of 18 living with them, 54.3% were married couples living together, 11.4% had a female householder with no husband present, 6.5% had a male householder with no wife present, and 27.9% were non-families. 22.5% of all households were made up of individuals, and 9.8% had someone living alone who was 65 years of age or older. The average household size was 2.65 and the average family size was 3.08.

The median age in the village was 38.9 years. 24% of residents were under the age of 18; 10% were between the ages of 18 and 24; 25% were from 25 to 44; 26.9% were from 45 to 64; and 14.1% were 65 years of age or older. The gender makeup of the village was 50.3% male and 49.7% female.

2000 census
As of the census of 2000, there were 1,111 people, 397 households, and 298 families living in the village. The racial makeup of the village was 97.48% White, 0.27% African American, 0.81% Native American, 0.27% Pacific Islander, 0.09% from other races, and 1.08% from two or more races. Hispanic or Latino of any race were 1.89% of the population.

There were 397 households, out of which 41.6% had children under the age of 18 living with them, 61.2% were married couples living together, 10.1% had a female householder with no husband present, and 24.7% were non-families. 20.9% of all households were made up of individuals, and 9.3% had someone living alone who was 65 years of age or older.  The average household size was 2.80 and the average family size was 3.23.

In the village, the population was spread out, with 32.3% under the age of 18, 7.7% from 18 to 24, 32.3% from 25 to 44, 16.0% from 45 to 64, and 11.6% who were 65 years of age or older.  The median age was 32 years. For every 100 females, there were 93.9 males.  For every 100 females age 18 and over, there were 90.4 males.

The median income for a household in the village was $42,083, and the median income for a family was $49,375. Males had a median income of $36,618 versus $26,875 for females. The per capita income for the village was $16,409.  About 3.7% of families and 5.3% of the population were below the poverty line, including 5.9% of those under age 18 and 6.3% of those age 65 or over.

References

Notes

Sources

Villages in Calhoun County, Michigan
Villages in Michigan
Populated places established in 1831